

Trafikkalfabetet is a sans-serif typeface used for road signs and, until 2002, vehicle registration plates in Norway. Developed in 1965 by Karl Petter Sandbæk, it was digitized in 2006 by Jacob Øvergaard.

Gallery

References

See also 
 Public signage typefaces

Government typefaces
Sans-serif typefaces